Asnodkar is a surname. Notable people with the surname include:

Rohit Asnodkar (born 1986), Indian cricketer
Swapnil Asnodkar (born 1984), Indian cricketer
Ulhas Asnodkar (born 1955), Indian politician

Indian surnames